Triplophysa brevicauda is a species of stone loach. It is endemic to China and was first described from Dabsan Nur lake in Qinghai. It grows to  SL.

References

B
Freshwater fish of China
Endemic fauna of China
Taxa named by Solomon Herzenstein
Fish described in 1888